Licínio de Almeida is a municipality in the state of Bahia in the North-East region of Brazil.

Notable people
 Tânia Martins (born 1957), poet

See also
List of municipalities in Bahia

References

Municipalities in Bahia